Ramachandrapuram is a town in Konaseema district of the Indian state of Andhra Pradesh. The town is a Municipality which serves as the headquarters of Ramachandrapuram mandal and Ramachandrapuram revenue division.

Geography 

It has an average elevation of 10 metres (32 feet).

Demographics

The total 
population constitute,  males,  females and 
 children, in the age group of 0–6 years. The average literacy rate stands at 
82.25% with  literates, significantly higher than the national average of 73.00%.

Transport 
The Andhra Pradesh State Road Transport Corporation operates bus services from Ramachandrapuram bus station. Ramachandrapuram railway station lies on Kakinada-Kotipalli railway line. The nearest major railway stations to the town are Kakinada Town railway station which is 30km away and Rajahmundry railway station which is 35km away. Rajahmundry Airport is 45km away from town.

Education
The primary and secondary school education is imparted by government, aided and private schools, under the School Education Department of the state. The medium of instruction followed by different schools are English, Telugu.

References 

Cities and towns in Konaseema district
Mandal headquarters in Konaseema district